This list of listed buildings in Morsø Municipality is a list of listed buildings in Morsø Municipality, Denmark.

The list

References

External links

 Danish Agency of Culture

Morsø
Buildings and structures in Morsø Municipality